A table or tableland is a butte, flank of a mountain, or mountain, that has a flat top. 

This kind of landform has numerous names, including:
 Butte
 Mesa
 
 Potrero
 Tepui
 Terrace
 Tuya

A homologous landform under the sea is called a tablemount or guyot.

Description
The term "flat" is relative when speaking of tables, and often the naming or identification of a table (or table hill or mountain) is based on the appearance of the terrain feature from a distance or from below it.  An example is Mesa Verde, Colorado, where the "flat top" of the mountain is both rolling terrain and cut by numerous deep canyons and arroyos, but whose rims appear quite flat from almost all directions, terminating in cliffs.

External links
 

 
Landforms
Mountains
Geography terminology